Napoléon Séguin (December 13, 1865 – January 29, 1940) was a Canadian politician.

Born in Sainte Madeleine de Rigaud, Canada East, Séguin was acclaimed to the Legislative Assembly of Quebec for Montréal division no. 1 in 1908. A Liberal, he was re-elected in Montréal–Sainte-Marie in 1912, 1916, and 1919. He was a Minister without Portfolio in the cabinet of Lomer Gouin in 1919 and in the cabinet of Louis-Alexandre Taschereau in 1920.

He resigned in 1921 when he was appointed Governor of the Bordeaux Prison, a post he held until 1939.

He died in Montréal-Nord in 1940.

References

1865 births
1940 deaths
People from Montréal-Nord
Canadian prison officials
Quebec Liberal Party MNAs